O Esca Viatorum ("O food of wayfarers") is a Latin-language Catholic eucharistic hymn. Its first edition is found in a Würzburg hymnal of 1647. It is sung to different tunes in the original Latin as well as in German and English translations.

Origin 
The authorship of this hymn is unknown; the widespread attribution to Saint Thomas Aquinas is definitely wrong. What is certain is that the earliest, extant publication of the text dates to 1647, and there is no evidence of an earlier genesis. The hymnologist Ernest Edwin Ryden supposes a "German Jesuit" to be the author.

Text 

The hymn consists of three verses with the rhyme scheme A-A-B-C-C-B. The first verse of the prayer expresses the desire to unite with Christ in eucharistic communion by means of his body; the second, by means of his blood. In the third verse, the singer's longing becomes eschatologic, and goes for the vision of Christ's face unveiled, whose hidden presence he adores in the eucharistic species.

Musical settings
The hymn has been set to music by several composers, including Johann Michael Haydn, Joseph Haydn and Peter Piel. Heinrich Isaac's Innsbruck, ich muss dich lassen is often performed with the words of O Esca Viatorum.

References

Latin-language Christian hymns
Eucharist in the Catholic Church
17th-century poems